Christina MacSweeney is a literary translator who usually translates Latin American fiction into English.

Her books include:
 Daniel Saldaña París - Among Strange Victims (Coffee House Press, 2016)
 Eduardo Rabasa - A Zero Sum Game (Deep Vellum, 2016)
 Valeria Luiselli - Sidewalks (Coffee House Press 2014); Faces in the Crowd (Coffee House Press, 2014); and The Story of My Teeth (Coffee House Press, 2015)
 Karla Suárez - Havana Year Zero (Charco Press, 2021)

References

Spanish–English translators
Year of birth missing (living people)
Living people